Canastota Public Library is a historic Carnegie library building located at Canastota in Madison County, New York.  It was designed and built in 1902, with funds provided by the philanthropist Andrew Carnegie.   It is one of 2,509 such libraries constructed between 1885 and 1919, and one of 107 in New York State. Carnegie provided $10,000 toward the construction of the Canastota library. It is a two-story building on a raised, rusticated stone and brick foundation in the Classical Revival style.

It was added to the National Register of Historic Places in 1986.

References

External links
Canastota Public Library website

Government buildings completed in 1902
Carnegie libraries in New York (state)
Libraries on the National Register of Historic Places in New York (state)
National Register of Historic Places in Madison County, New York
Education in Madison County, New York